Kundazhiyur  is a village in Thrissur district in the state of Kerala, India.

Demographics
 India census, Kundazhiyur had a population of 11055 with 5033 males and 6022 females.

References

Villages in Thrissur district